The Henryhouse Formation is a geologic formation in Oklahoma. It preserves fossils dating back to the Silurian period.

See also

 List of fossiliferous stratigraphic units in Oklahoma
 Paleontology in Oklahoma

References

 

Silurian geology of Oklahoma
Silurian southern paleotemperate deposits